The Black Waters of Echo's Pond is a 2009 fantasy horror film directed by the Italo-American film maker Gabriel Bologna. It stars Robert Patrick, Danielle Harris, and James Duval.

Plot

A groups of friends vacation in a plush mansion, where they find a mysterious board game which draws out the nastiest qualities in all of its players.

Cast

Production
The film was shot in the United States in Hollywood, Los Angeles, Malibou Lake, Agoura, Topanga Canyon, California and finally in Turkey. On 20 March 2010, Parallel Media released the official six-minute theatrical TV advertisement. The film is based on a screenplay by Sean Clark (the author of Bloody Disgusting), Michael Berenson and the director himself. In the lead roles, Bologna cast Robert Patrick, Danielle Harris, James Duval, Nick Mennell, Electra and Elise Avellan.

Release
It was premiered on October 11, 2009, as part of the Freak Show Horror Film Festival at the yearly Spooky Empire horror convention. and the limited theatrical release was on April 9, 2010.

Reception
On Metacritic, which assigns a normalized rating to reviews, the film has a weighted average score of 31 out of 100, based on seven critics, indicating "generally unfavorable reviews".

Marc Savlov from the Austin Chronicle awarded the film three out of a possible five stars, writing, "Far better (and, freakishly, more subtle) at recalling the tone and spirit of Eighties teen moviegoing than the faux-dopey slapstick of Hot Tub Time Machine, Bologna's homage to exsanguinations past is a bloody good updating of past arterial spurters." Dennis Harvey from Variety gave the film a negative review, writing, "Silly, scareless The Black Waters of Echo’s Pond finds yet another group of disposable youths unleashing yet another ancient evil something or other, to their inevitable detriment. Though this generic horror meller would be most at home debuting on Syfy — perhaps double-billed with Pinata: Survival Island".

Soundtrack
The score was composed by the Italo-American jazz-soloist and film composer Harry Manfredini.

References

External links
 
 
 
 

2009 films
2009 horror films
2009 fantasy films
2000s thriller films
American horror thriller films
2009 independent films
Films scored by Harry Manfredini
Films directed by Gabriel Bologna
Films shot in California
Films shot in Los Angeles
Films shot in Turkey
American independent films
2000s English-language films
2000s American films